Mahu-Rannametsa Nature Reserve is a nature reserve which is located in Lääne-Viru County, Estonia.

The area of the nature reserve is 413 ha.

The protected area was founded in 2006 to protect valuable habitat types and threatened species in Mahu, Pärna and Unukse village (all in former Viru-Nigula Parish).

References

Nature reserves in Estonia
Geography of Lääne-Viru County